Jack Harkness (born 19 January 2004) is a Scottish professional footballer who plays as a defender for Rangers.

Club career
Harkness started his career in the youth ranks of Rangers and features regularly for Rangers B.

He signed to 77 Sports Management in February 2021.

In November 2021, he signed a contract extension with the Gers, keeping him at the club until the summer of 2023.

Harkness signed a new three-year deal with the Gers in December 2022.

International career
Harkness made his international debut for Scotland U16 on 22 January 2020 in a 3–2 defeat to Australia.

References

External links
Jack Harkness on Soccerbase

2004 births
Living people
Scottish footballers
Scottish Football League players
Association football defenders
Rangers F.C. players
People from Bathgate
Footballers from West Lothian